Morena/Linda Vista station is an at-grade station on the Green Line of the San Diego Trolley system. It is located alongside Friars Road at its intersection with Napa Street. It is located just east of the junction of Morena Boulevard and Linda Vista Road, after which the station is named, in the Morena neighborhood of San Diego.

An apartment complex has been constructed next to the station, which also has a 199 space park and ride lot. The University of San Diego can also be reached on foot from this station, as the western entrance of the university is within approximately 5 blocks of the station.

This station opened on November 23, 1997, as part of the Blue Line Mission Valley Line extension to Mission San Diego station. Blue Line service to this station was replaced by the Green Line on July 10, 2005, as part of the Mission Valley East extension. Before the opening of the Mission Valley East extension, this station was rebuilt to raise the platform to accommodate the new low-floor trolley vehicles, giving passengers level access to trains without using steps or a wheelchair lift.

Station layout
There are two tracks, each served by a side platform.

See also
 List of San Diego Trolley stations

References

External links
 SDMTS Bus connections in Linda Vista

Green Line (San Diego Trolley)
San Diego Trolley stations in San Diego
Railway stations in the United States opened in 1997
1997 establishments in California